The General Motors G platform (also called G-body) was an automobile platform designation used for mid-sized rear-wheel drive cars.  It made its first appearance from the 1969 to 1972 model years, adapted from GM's A-body, and reappeared from 1982 to 1988. The second series of G-bodies began production designated as A-body cars in 1978, but were redesignated as G-body when the new front-wheel drive A-body platform was introduced in 1982.

Use
The G-body designation was originally used for the 1969–1972 Pontiac Grand Prix and 1970–1972 Chevrolet Monte Carlo personal luxury cars, which rode on longer wheelbases than A-body coupes.

For 1973, the Grand Prix and Monte Carlo were related to the A-body line, with all formal-roof A-body coupes designated as A-Special (and, after 1982, G-Special). These special coupes included the Monte Carlo, Grand Prix, Oldsmobile Cutlass Supreme, and Buick Regal.

For the 1982 model year, GM introduced a new front-wheel drive A platform for its mid-size car lines. The rear-wheel drive platform that had been in use since 1978 was re-designated as the G platform, and select models remained in production. The Chevrolet Malibu and Pontiac LeMans coupes were dropped; on sedans and wagons the LeMans nameplate continued only in Canada while the formerly full-size Bonneville replaced it in the U.S. 1983 was the last year for the Malibu sedan and all station wagons, leaving the G-Special coupes; Buick, Oldsmobile, and Pontiac formal-roof sedans; and the Chevrolet El Camino/GMC Caballero. For 1988, most remaining G-body models were moved to the new front-wheel drive W platform. The Pontiac Bonneville had been moved to the H platform for 1987, the El Camino was dropped without a replacement, and there would be a one-year gap before the W-body Chevrolet Lumina coupe replaced the Monte Carlo. GM later used the G-body designation for unrelated full-sized front-wheel drive cars.

The G-bodies were some of the last cars to follow the front-engine, large V8 and rear-wheel drive muscle car formula, remaining popular while most mid-sized cars moved to front-wheel drive.  They were also among the last production-based vehicles raced in NASCAR (and competitively, with the Buick Regal in particular dominating many races in its time). NASCAR regulations continued to stipulate production body parts until 2003 (namely, the hood, roof, and deck lid), but since most of the vehicles that bodies were derived from during this period had a transverse front-wheel drive layout (many even lacking a V8 as an option), the drivetrain and all running gear were either custom-built or sourced from other (usually, older) models.

Vehicles

This family consisted of:
 Buick Regal (1982–1987)
 Chevrolet El Camino (1982–1987)
 Chevrolet Malibu (1982–1983)
 Chevrolet Monte Carlo (1982–1988)
 GMC Caballero (1982–1987)
 Oldsmobile Cutlass Supreme (1982–1987)
 Oldsmobile Cutlass Supreme Classic (1988)
 Oldsmobile Cutlass Cruiser (1982–1983)
 Pontiac Grand LeMans (1982–1983) (Canada only)
 Pontiac Bonneville (1982–1986) 
 Pontiac Grand Prix (1982–1987)

Performance variants
Performance applications included:
 1982 Buick Regal Sport Coupe 3.8 L (231 in³) V6 Turbo
 1982–1987 Chevrolet El Camino SS 5.0 L (305 in³)
 1983–1984 Oldsmobile Hurst/Olds 5.0 L (307 in³) HO V8
 1983–1988 Chevrolet Monte Carlo SS 5.0 L (305 in³) HO V8
 1983–1986 Buick Regal T-Type 3.8 L (231 in³) V6 Turbo
 1982, 1984–1987 Buick Grand National 3.8 L (231 in³) V6 Turbo
 1985–1987 Oldsmobile 442 5.0 L (307 in³) HO V8
 1986–1987 Chevrolet Monte Carlo SS Aerocoupe 5.0 L (305 in³) HO V8
 1986.5 Pontiac Grand Prix 2+2 5.0 L (305 in³) V8

The 1986.5 Grand Prix 2+2 had cosmetic changes which included a NASCAR-qualifying nose cone (also available through GM for installation on any 1981–1987 Grand Prix). There were 17 Grand Prix GTs offered by Myrtle Motors in New York which offered a slightly different look and had some performance tuning in 1986.

 1987 Buick Regal T Turbo 3.8 L (231 in³) V6 Turbo
 1987 Buick Regal T (307 in³)
 1987 Buick Regal: many base and Limited models featured the 3.8 L turbocharged (231 in³) V6
 1987 Buick GNX 3.8 L (231 in³) V6 Turbo

The 1987 GNX was made in conjunction with ASC/McLaren and 547 were made, which included a unique suspension system, fender flares, Stewart-Warner gauges, larger Garret turbocharger and intercooler, and a net power of 276 hp (206 kW), above the 245 hp (183 kW) of the regular Grand National.

References

External links
G-Body forum and information
The Original G-Body central information hub
GBodyForum.com -- '78-'88 GM A/G Body Community
OldsGmail.com - Home of the Oldsmobile G-Body Mailing List
GBodies.com - Devoted to the GM G Bodies
List of GM VIN codes

G 1